The Brooklyn Ward's Wonders were a professional baseball team based in Brooklyn, New York, that played in the Players' League for one season in 1890. The franchise used Eastern Park as their home field. During their only season in existence, the team finished second in the PL with a record of 76-56.

Players

References

External links
Franchise index at Baseball-Reference and Retrosheet

Major League Baseball all-time rosters